Christmas Angel may refer to:

 Gabriel, the angel of the Nativity of Jesus
 Tree-topper, in the form of an angel
 The Christmas Angel, a 1904 French silent film
 The Christmas Angel: A Family Story, a 1998 album by Mannheim Steamroller
 Christmas Angel, a 2008 album, or its title song, by Tamara Gee

See also
 Christmas Angels, an EP by Clannad